Woodbury is a city in Meriwether County, Georgia, United States. The population was 908 at the 2020 census.

History 
The Georgia General Assembly incorporated Woodbury in 1913. The community most likely was named after Levi Woodbury (1789–1851), American justice on the United States Supreme Court.

Geography
Woodbury is located in southeastern Meriwether County at  (32.980588, -84.580979). Georgia State Routes 18, 74, 85, and 109 pass through the city. Route 18 leads northwest  to Greenville, the county seat, and northeast  to Zebulon. Route 74 goes east out of Woodbury with Route 18 but leads southeast  to Thomaston; to the north Route 74 leads  to Gay. Route 85 goes north to Gay with Route 74 but also leads south  to Manchester. Route 85 Alternate runs through the north side of Woodbury and leads southwest  to Warm Springs. Route 109 follows Route 18 both northwest and east out of Woodbury but leads east  to Barnesville. 

Demographics

2020 census

As of the 2020 United States census, there were 908 people, 456 households, and 260 families residing in the city.

2000 census
At the 2000 census there were 1,184 people in 454 households, including 302 families, in the city. The racial makeup of the city was 42.40% White, 56.50% African American, and 1.10% from two or more races. Hispanic or Latino of any race were 0.68%.

Of the 454 households 27.5% had children under the age of 18 living with them, 37.7% are married couples.
Together, 22.9% had a female householder with no husband present, and 33.3% were non-families. 30.8% of households were one person and 17.4% were one person aged 65 or older.  The average household size was 2.61 and the average family size was 3.31.

The age distribution was 24.7% under the age of 18, 10.3% from 18 to 24, 23.1% from 25 to 44, 25.1% from 45 to 64, and 16.8% 65 or older.  The median age was 38 years. For every 100 females, there were 86.8 males.  For every 100 females age 18 and over, there were 81.7 males.

The median household income was $26,339 and the median family income  was $31,389. Males had a median income of $26,563 versus $18,287 for females. The per capita income for the city was $12,162.  About 24.8% of families and 25.4% of the population were below the poverty line, including 33.2% of those under age 18 and 24.9% of those age 65 or over.

In popular culture
 Woodbury is featured prominently in The Walking Dead comic book franchise as a fortified survivor settlement run by a leader called The Governor during a zombie apocalypse. In the television series of the same name, the Woodbury scenes were filmed in Senoia,  to the north.

References

Cities in Georgia (U.S. state)
Cities in Meriwether County, Georgia